Central vein can refer to:
 Central veins of liver
 Central retinal vein
 Central vein of suprarenal gland

Also:
 Kuhnt's postcentral vein